"Ever Free" is the tenth single by Japanese musician hide, the third to bear the hide with Spread Beaver name, released on May 27, 1998. It debuted at number one on the Oricon chart, replacing his previous single "Pink Spider", and was the 23rd best-selling single of the year and certified double platinum by the RIAJ.

On May 2, 2007, the single was re-released. On December 8, 2010, it was re-released again as part of the third releases in "The Devolution Project", which was a release of hide's original eleven singles on picture disc vinyl.

Reception
"Ever Free" debuted at number one on the Japanese Oricon weekly charts, replacing his previous single "Pink Spider", with sales of over 516,000 in the initial week. By the end of the year it sold 842,440 copies and was the 23rd best-selling single of the year, being certified double Platinum by the RIAJ.

Track listing
All songs written by hide.

The hidden untitled third track begins with 5 minutes and 13 seconds of silence, representing May 13, the date "Pink Spider" was released, before playing a piece of that song.

Personnel
hide – vocals, guitar, bass
Joe – drums
Eric Westfall – mixing engineer, recording engineer (at Sunset Sound)
S. Husky Höskulds – assistant engineer (Sunset Sound Factory)
Daiei Matsumoto – recording engineer (at Hitokuchizaka-Studio)
Kazuhiko Inada – recording engineer
Hiroshi Nemoto – assistant engineer (Hitokuchizaka-Studio)
Kevin Dean – assistant engineer (Sunset Sound)
Personnel per Ja, Zoo liner notes.

Cover versions
The song was covered by Transtic Nerve on the 1999 hide tribute album Tribute Spirits.

It was also covered live by DJ Ozma at the hide memorial summit on May 3, 2008.

An instrumental version of the song was included in the soundtrack of the movie Attitude, which was scored by hide's former X bandmate Taij.

The track was covered by defspiral, which is composed of four of the five former members of Transtic Nerve, for the Tribute II -Visual Spirits- tribute album and by Born for Tribute III -Visual Spirits-, both albums were released on July 3, 2013.

Yuki Koyanagi recorded a version for Tribute VI -Female Spirits-, released on December 18, 2013.

It was covered by Takanori Nishikawa for the June 6, 2018 Tribute Impulse album.

Danganronpa creator Kazutaka Kodaka; a long time hide fan was given permission to use this song for the Danganronpa 3 anime.

References

External links

Hide (musician) songs
Oricon Weekly number-one singles
Songs released posthumously
1998 singles
Songs written by hide (musician)
1998 songs